XHZM-FM is a radio station on 92.5 FM in Puebla, Puebla. The station is owned by Grupo Ultra and known as Ultra 92.5.

History
XHZM received its first concession on August 9, 1972. It was owned by Arturo Zorrilla Martínez, who founded Ultra. The original format was Stereorey, an English-language adult contemporary music format from the company now known as MVS Radio. The concessionaire was transferred to a company in 2006.

References

Radio stations in Puebla
Radio stations established in 1972